The 1983 Davies and Tate British Open Championships was held at the Carrington Club with the later stages being held at the Derby Assembly Rooms from 4–11 April 1983.

Jahangir Khan won his second consecutive title defeating Gamal Awad in the final.

Seeds

Draw and results

Final
 Jahangir Khan beat  Gamal Awad 9-2 9-5 9-1

Section 1

Section 2

Gogi Alauddin & Karimullah Khan of Pakistan both failed to attend their first round matches and were disqualified.

References

Men's British Open Squash Championships
Squash in England
Men's British Open Championship
Men's British Open Squash Championship
Men's British Open Squash Championship
Sport in Derby
1980s in Derby